The 2017 NCAA Division I Tennis Championships was the men's and women's tennis tournaments played concurrently from May 18 to May 29, 2017 in Athens, Georgia at the Dan Magill Tennis Complex on the campus of the University of Georgia. It was the 72nd edition of the NCAA Division I Men's Tennis Championship* and the 36th edition of the NCAA Division I Women's Tennis Championship.* It was the 12th time that the men's and women's tournaments were held at the same venue. It consisted of a men's and women's team, singles, and doubles championships.

Men's team championship

National seeds

1.  Wake Forest (Quarterfinal)
2.  Virginia (National Champions)
3.  Ohio State (semifinal)
4.  USC (round of 16)
5.  UCLA  (quarterfinals)
6.  TCU  (quarterfinals)
7.  Baylor  (round of 16)
8.  California (round of 16)
9.  North Carolina (Runner-up)  
10.  Texas   (quarterfinals)
11.  Oklahoma State (second round) 
12.  Texas A&M (round of 16) 
13.  Georgia  (semifinals)
14.  Oklahoma (round of 16)
15.  Florida (round of 16) 
16.  Stanford (round of 16)

Bracket

Top half

Section 1

Section 2

Bottom half

Section 3

Section 4

Finals

Women's team championship

National seeds

1. Florida (National Champions)
2. North Carolina (quarterfinals)
3. Ohio State (semifinals)
4. Vanderbilt (semifinals)

5. Georgia (round of 16)
6. Texas Tech (quarterfinals)
7. Stanford (Runner-up)
8. Georgia Tech (round of 16)

9. Oklahoma State (quarterfinals)
10. Michigan (round of 16)
11. Auburn (round of 16)
12. Pepperdine (quarterfinals)

13. California (round of 16)
14. South Carolina (round of 16)
15. Duke  (round of 16)
16. Baylor (second round)

Bracket

Top half

Section 1

Section 2

Bottom half

Section 3

Section 4

Finals

Men's singles championship

National seeds

 Mikael Torpegaard, Ohio State (round of 16)
 Nuno Borges, Mississippi State (semifinals)
 Petros Chrysochos, Wake Forest (round of 16)
 Arthur Rinderknech, Texas A&M (round of 64)
 Christopher Eubanks, Georgia Tech (quarterfinals)
 Alfredo Perez, Florida (round of 16)
 Hugo Di Feo, Ohio State (round of 64)
 Tom Fawcett, Stanford (semifinals)

Players ranked 9th–16th, listed by last name
 Juan Benitez, Baylor (round of 64)
 William Blumberg, North Carolina (final)
 William Bushamuka, Kentucky (Round of 16)
 Thai-Son Kwiatkowski, Virginia (National Champion)
 Florian Lakat, California (round of 16)
 Skander Mansouri, Wake Forest (quarterfinals)
 Michael Redlicki, Arkansas (round of 32)
 Constantin Schmitz, Tulane (round of 64)

Bracket

Finals

Top half

Section 1

Section 2

Bottom half

Section 3

Section 4

Women's singles championship

National seeds

 Francesca Di Lorenzo, Ohio State (round of 64)
 Hayley Carter, North Carolina (round of 64)
 Astra Sharma, Vanderbilt (withdrew)
 Ena Shibahara, UCLA (round of 16)
 Blair Shankle, Baylor (round of 16)
 Belinda Woolcock, Florida (finals) 
 Jasmine Lee, Mississippi State (round of 64)
 Viktoriya Lushkova, Oklahoma State (round of 32)

Players ranked 9th–16th, listed by last name
 Sydney Campbell, Vanderbilt (semifinals)
 Jade Lewis, LSU (round of 32)
 Ellen Perez, Georgia (round of 16)
 Rachel Pierson, Texas A&M (round of 64)
 Karla Popovic, California (round of 16)
 Erin Routliffe, Alabama (round of 64)
 Luisa Stefani, Pepperdine (round of 64)
 Gabriela Talabă, Texas Tech (round of 32)

Finals

Top half

Section 1

Section 2

Bottom half

Section 3

Section 4

Men's doubles championship

National seeds

 Robert Loeb/Jan Zieliński, Georgia (finals)
 Martin Redlicki/Evan Zhu, UCLA (quarterfinals)
 Johannes Ingildsen/Alfredo Perez, Florida (quarterfinals)
 Skander Mansouri/Christian Seraphim, Wake Forest (semifinals)

Teams seeded 5th–8th in no particular order
 AJ Catanzariti/Arthur Rinderknech, Texas A&M (round of 32)
 Filip Bergevi/Florian Lakat, California (round of 16)
 Julian Cash/Arjun Kadhe, Oklahoma St. (round of 16)
 Mike Redlicki/Jose Salazar, Arkansas (round of 16)

Bracket

Finals

Top half

Bottom half

Women's doubles championship

National seeds

Bracket

References

External links
 NCAA Division I Men's Team Bracket
 NCAA Division I Women's Team Bracket
 NCAA Division I Men's Singles Bracket
 NCAA Division I Women's Singles Bracket
 NCAA Division I Men's Doubles Bracket

NCAA Division I tennis championships
2017 in American tennis